Essential oils are volatile and liquid aroma compounds from natural sources, usually plants. They are not oils in a strict sense, but often share with oils a poor solubility in water. Essential oils often have an odor and are therefore used in food flavoring and perfumery. They are usually prepared by fragrance extraction techniques (such as distillation, cold pressing, or Solvent extraction). Essential oils are distinguished from aroma oils (essential oils and aroma compounds in an oily solvent), infusions in a vegetable oil, absolutes, and concretes. Typically, essential oils are highly complex mixtures of often hundreds of individual aroma compounds.

Highly prized for its fragrance.
 Ajwain oil, distilled from the leaves of (Carum copticum). Oil contains 35–65% thymol.
 Angelica root oil, distilled from the Angelica archangelica.
 Anise oil, from the Pimpinella anisum, rich odor of licorice
 Asafoetida oil, used to flavor food.
 Balsam of Peru, from the Myroxylon, used in food and drink for flavoring, in perfumes and toiletries for fragrance
 Basil oil, used in making perfumes, as well as in aromatherapy
 Bay leaf oil is used in perfumery and aromatherapy
 Bergamot oil, used in aromatherapy and in perfumes.
 Birch oil used in aromatherapy
 Black pepper oil is distilled from the berries of Piper nigrum.
 Blue tansy (Tanacetum annuum) for the color of its oil.
 Buchu oil, made from the buchu shrub. Considered toxic and no longer widely used. Formerly used medicinally.
 Calamodin oil or calamansi essential oil comes from a citrus tree in the Philippines extracted via cold press or steam distillation.
 Calamus oil Used in perfumery and formerly as a food additive
 Camphor oil used in cosmetics and household cleaners.
 Cannabis flower essential oil, used as a flavoring in foods, primarily candy and beverages. Also used as a scent in perfumes, cosmetics, soaps, and candles.
 Caraway seed oil, used a flavoring in foods. Also used in mouthwashes, toothpastes, etc. as a flavoring agent.
 Cardamom seed oil, used in aromatherapy. Extracted from seeds of subspecies of Zingiberaceae (ginger). Also used as a fragrance in soaps, perfumes, etc.
 Carrot seed oil, used in aromatherapy.
 Cedar oil (or cedarwood oil), primarily used in perfumes and fragrances.
 Chamomile oil, there are many varieties of chamomile but only two are used in aromatherapy, Roman and German. German chamomile contains a higher level of the chemical azulene
 Cinnamon oil, used for flavoring 
 Cistus ladanifer leaves and flowers used in perfumery.
 Citron oil, used in Ayurveda and perfumery.
 Citronella oil, from a plant related to lemon grass is used as an insect repellent
 Clary Sage oil, used in perfumery and as an additive flavoring in some alcoholic beverages.
 Clove oil used in perfumery and medicinally.
 Coconut oil, used for skin, food, and hair
 Coffee oil, used to flavor food.
 Coriander oil
 Costmary oil (bible leaf oil), formerly used medicinally in Europe; still used as such in southwest Asia. Discovered to contain up to 12.5% of the toxin β-thujone.
 Costus root oil
 Cranberry seed oil, equally high in omega-3 and omega-6 fatty acids, primarily used in the cosmetic industry.
 Cubeb oil, used to flavor foods.
 Cumin seed oil/black seed oil, used as a flavor, particularly in meat products 
 Curry leaf oil, used to flavor food.
 Cypress oil, used in cosmetics
 Cypriol oil
 Davana oil, from the Artemisia pallens, used as a perfume ingredient
 Dill oil, chemically almost identical to Caraway seed oil. High carvone content.
 Elecampane oil
 Elemi oil, used as a perfume and fragrance ingredient. Comes from the oleoresins of Canarium luzonicum and Canarium ovatum which are common in the Philippines.
 Eucalyptus oil, historically used as a germicide. 
 Fennel seed oil
 Fenugreek oil, used for cosmetics from ancient times.
 Fir oil 
 Frankincense oil, used in aromatherapy and in perfumes.
 Galangal oil , used to flavor food.
 Galbanum oil, used in perfumery.
 Garlic oil is distilled from Allium sativum.
 Geranium oil, also referred to as geranol.  Used in herbal medicine, aromatherapy, and perfumery.
 Ginger oil, used medicinally in many cultures, and has been studied extensively as a nausea treatment, where it was found more effective than placebo.
 Goldenrod oil used in herbal medicine, including treatment of urological problems.
 Grapefruit oil, extracted from the peel of the fruit. Used in aromatherapy. Contains 90% limonene.
 Henna oil, used in body art.  Known to be dangerous to people with certain enzyme deficiencies.  Pre-mixed pastes are considered dangerous, primarily due to adulterants.
 Helichrysum oil
 Hickory nut oil
 Horseradish oil
 Hyssop
 Jasmine oil, used for its flowery fragrance.
 Juniper berry oil, used as a flavor.
 Lavender oil, used primarily as a fragrance. 
 Ledum
 Lemon oil, similar in fragrance to the fruit. Unlike other essential oils, lemon oil is usually cold pressed. Used in cosmetics.
 Lemongrass. Lemongrass is a highly fragrant grass from India. The oil is very useful for insect repellent.
 Lime
 Litsea cubeba oil, lemon-like scent, often used in perfumes and aromatherapy.
 Linalool
 Mandarin
 Marjoram
 Melissa oil (Lemon balm), sweet smelling oil
 Mentha arvensis oil, mint oil, used in flavoring toothpastes, mouthwashes and pharmaceuticals,  as well as in aromatherapy.
 Moringa oil, can be used directly on the skin and hair. It can also be used in soap and as a base for other cosmetics.
 Mountain Savory
 Mugwort oil, used in ancient times for medicinal and magical purposes. Currently considered to be a neurotoxin.
 Mustard oil, containing a high percentage of allyl isothiocyanate or other isothiocyanates, depending on the species of mustard
 Myrrh oil, warm, slightly musty smell.
 Myrtle
 Neem oil or neem tree oil
 Neroli is produced from the blossom of the bitter orange tree.
 Nutmeg oil
 Orange oil, like lemon oil, cold pressed rather than distilled. Consists of 90% d-Limonene. Used as a fragrance, in cleaning products and in flavoring foods.
 Oregano oil, contains thymol and carvacrol
 Orris oil is extracted from the roots of the Florentine iris (Iris florentina), Iris germanica and Iris pallida. It is used as a flavouring agent, in perfume, and medicinally.
 Palo Santo
 Parsley oil, used in soaps, detergents, colognes, cosmetics and perfumes, especially men's fragrances.
 Patchouli oil, very common ingredient in perfumes.
 Perilla essential oil, extracted from the leaves of the perilla plant. Contains about 50–60% perillaldehyde.
 Pennyroyal oil, highly toxic. It is abortifacient and can even in small quantities cause acute liver and lung damage.
 Peppermint oil
 Petitgrain
 Pine oil, used as a disinfectant, and in aromatherapy.
 Ravensara
 Red Cedar
 Roman Chamomile
 Rose oil, distilled from rose petals, used primarily as a fragrance.
 Rosehip oil, distilled from the seeds of the Rosa rubiginosa or Rosa mosqueta. 
 Rosemary oil, distilled from the flowers of Rosmarinus officinalis. 
 Rosewood oil, used primarily for skin care applications.
 Sage oil,

 Sandalwood oil, used primarily as a fragrance, for its pleasant, woody fragrance.
 Sassafras oil, from sassafras root bark.  Used in aromatherapy, soap-making, perfumes, and the like.  Formerly used as a spice, and as the primary flavoring of root beer, inter alia.  Sassafras oil is heavily regulated in the United States due to its high safrole content.
 Savory oil, from Satureja species. Used in aromatherapy, cosmetic and soap-making applications.
 Schisandra oil
 Spearmint oil, often used in flavoring mouthwash and chewing gum, among other applications.
 Spikenard
 Spruce oil
 Star anise oil, highly fragrant oil using in cooking. Also used in perfumery and soaps, has been used in toothpastes, mouthwashes, and skin creams. 90% of the world's star anise crop is used in the manufacture of Tamiflu, a drug used to treat influenza, and is hoped to be useful for avian flu
 Tangerine
 Tarragon oil, distilled from Artemisia dracunculus
 Tea tree oil, extracted from Melaleuca alternifolia.
 Thyme oil
 Tsuga belongs to the pine tree family. 
 Turmeric, used to flavor food.
 Valerian
 Warionia, used as a perfume ingredient 
 Vetiver oil (khus oil) a thick, amber oil, primarily from India. Used as a fixative in perfumery, and in aromatherapy.
 Western red cedar
 Wintergreen 
 Yarrow oil
 Ylang-ylang

See also
 Eau de Cologne
 perfume

Books
 Julia Lawless, The Illustrated Encyclopedia of Essential Oils: The Complete Guide to the Use of Oils in Aromatherapy and Herbalism 1995
The Complete Book of Essential Oils & Aromatherapy

References 

Essential oils